Chunkzz is a 2017 Indian Malayalam-language comedy film directed by Omar Lulu and produced by Vyshak Rajan. It was written by debutants Joseph Vijeesh, Sanoop Thykoodam, and Aneesh Hameed from a story by Lulu. The film stars Balu Varghese, Dharmajan Bolgatty, Ganapathi S. Poduwal, and Vishak Nair in the titular roles, along with Honey Rose. Chunkzz was released in theatres on 4 August 2017. The film was a commercial success at the box office.

Plot

The story is all about four friends Romario, Riyas, Yudas and Athmaram. The story develops into a new turn when Romario's childhood friend Riya comes to their college to study. The four friends try hard to woo Riya. At that time, Riya and Romario leave to Goa and send his friends pictures which he actually faked, and it was to make them believe that they had sex in the hotel. At the same time, Riya's brother spots her there and takes her back home and informs her dad about the matter.

Later, the situation turns out as if Riya is pregnant and Roamario should marry her. Romario confesses to his friends that nothing of that sort has happened, but they do not believe him at first. Later it is revealed that it was Riya who fooled her father she is pregnant, for marrying Romario. At last it is  revealed that it was Romario who brought her from Bangalore to Kerala in-order to marry her and become rich. Later they get married.

Cast

 Balu Varghese as Romario Varghese
 Vishak Nair as Yudas Thaddeus / Dasappan
 Dharmajan Bolgatty as Athmaram K. T./ Athmavu
 Ganapathi as Riyas
 Honey Rose as Riya Pappachan / Pinky
 Lal as Varkichan, Romario's father
 Noorin Shereef as Romario's sister
 Siddique as Pappachan
 Mareena Michael Kurisingal as Sherin
 Monika Thomas Puthuran as Rasiya
 Hareesh Perumanna as Preman
 Remya Panickar as Jolly Miss
 Reena Basheer as Mary
 Kailash as Freddy
 Anjali Nair as Ancy
 SMES Aswanth Kok
 Lintu Rony as Riya's sister
 Shammi Thilakan as Jose /Oola jose
 Binoy Nambala as Balan
 Saranya Anand as Soni miss
 Arjun Nandhakumar as Arjun, Riya's friend

Production
The film was announced with a title in January 2017. It was written by debutants Joseph Vijeesh, Sanoop Thykoodam, and Aneesh Hameed from a story by Lulu. It was the second film of Lulu after Happy Wedding. Balu Varghese, Dharmajan Bolgatty, Vishak Nair, and Ganapathi plays the titular characters, while Honey Rose plays the female lead. Omar said the film wil begin shooting on 9 February 2017 at Sree Sankara College.

Reception

Box office
The film was a commercial success at the box office. It grossed an estimated amount of 21.3 crore at worldwide box office against a budget of 3.5 crore.

Critical response
Selena Gomez of The Quint rated the film 3 out of 5 stars, stating that "it basically unveils the meaning of friendship with trust, care and inspiration". Anagha Jayan E. of Malayala Manorama rated the movie 2.5 out of 5 and called it "a strong brew of fun, frolic and friendship" and "a full-fledged entertainer, which would make one roll on the floor laughing. A light movie, which doesn't involve any complex thoughts and emotions, here's a film that you can enjoy to the fullest". Deepa Soman of The Times of India rated the movie 2.5 out of 5 and said "Watch Chunkzz if you can appreciate a few adult jokes, without thinking much about the logic in the story line". Behindwoods rated 2.25 out of 5 and said that "the major chunk of humour in Chunkzz will satisfy the youth", but excluding that, the "screenplay will seem very amateur and out of shape".

Filmibeat rated 2.5 out of 5 and called it "a fun-filled entertainer which is strictly meant for the youth audiences". Sify rated 3 out of 5, but wrote that "Chunkzz is filled with double meaning dialogues ... no point in looking for logic or a credible storyline here and the whole film has been done as a string of comic episodes". Meera Suresh of The New Indian Express views the film as "an adult comedy in the garb of an entertainer ... the lack of meat in the plot has been concealed with some witty one-liners. This ploy works, somehow. Vandana Mohandas of Deccan Chronicle rated 1.5 out of 5 and wrote that it has "overdose of sexist jokes ... what begins as a campus story is neither a romantic entertainer nor a humorous movie".

References

External links

2010s Malayalam-language films
Indian sex comedy films
Films set in Bangalore
Films shot in Bangalore
Films shot in Thrissur
Films shot in Kochi
Films directed by Omar Lulu